Moel Llyfnant is a mountain in the southern portion of the Snowdonia National Park in Gwynedd, Wales. It is a peak in the Arenig mountain range. It lies to the west of Arenig Fawr. It has one notable top, the twin peaked Gallt y Daren, being at the end of its west ridge.

The summit area has rocky outcrops, on top of one lies the small cairn that marks the summit. The views of Arenig Fawr are excellent, while to the south Rhobell Fawr and Dduallt can be observed, and to the west Gallt y Daren and Foel Boeth.

References

Marilyns of Wales
Hewitts of Wales
Nuttalls
Mountains and hills of Snowdonia
Llanuwchllyn
Llanycil
Mountains and hills of Gwynedd